The following lists events that happened during 1804 in Australia.

Incumbents
Monarch - George III

Governors
Governors of the Australian colonies:
Governor of New South Wales – Captain Philip King
Lieutenant-Governor of Southern Van Diemen's Land – David Collins
Lieutenant-Governor of Northern Van Diemen's Land – William Paterson

Events
 4 March – The Castle Hill convict rebellion, also known as the Battle of Vinegar Hill, takes place: 200 convicts, mostly Irish, rebel.  Fifty-one convicts are punished, and nine hanged.<ref>Whitaker, Anne-Maree: Castle Hill convict rebellion 1804, Dictionary of Sydney.</ref>
 3 May – An Aboriginal food hunting party is attacked by settlers and soldiers at Risdon Cove. Eyewitness estimates of the death toll from the massacre vary from three or four to fifty.
 16 September – A government-owned brewery is opened at Parramatta as a means of controlling the consumption of spirits.
 4 November – In a letter to Sir Joseph Banks, Matthew Flinders recommends that the newly discovered country, New Holland, be renamed "Australia" or "Terra Australis" (from the Latin "australis" meaning "of the south").

Exploration and settlement
15 February – Lieutenant-Governor David Collins lands at Risdon Cove in Van Diemen's Land (Tasmania). Unhappy with the area as a site for a settlement, Collins sends his surveyor, George Prideaux Harris, and harbour master William Collins in search of an alternative site. Harris and Collins recommend Sullivan's Cove.
24 March – The settlement at the Hunter River, also known as the Coal River, is officially named Newcastle.
8 May – Lieutenant-Governor Collins establishes the settlement at Sullivan's Cove on the Derwent River.
15 June – The name "Hobart Town", after the Colonial Secretary Lord Hobart, is adopted as the name for the new colony at Sullivan's Cove.
5 November – Lieutenant-Colonel William Paterson arrives at Outer Cove, leading the Buffalo, the Lady Nelson'' and two schooners, under instructions from London to form a settlement in the north of Van Diemen's Land.

Births
 5 October – Robert Campbell, politician (died 1859)

Deaths
 21 March – James Bloodsworth (born 1759), convict and bricklayer
 27 December – George Barrington (born 1755), convict and police officer

References

 
Australia
Years of the 19th century in Australia